Noah Sikombe Chivuta (born 25 December 1983 in Ndola) is a Zambian footballer who plays for Sakaeo in Thai League 3 and the Zambia National Team.

Career
Left-footed Chivuta has spent most of his playing career in South Africa.

Year joined Stars: 2010
Previous clubs: Roan United, Hellenic FC, Pietersburg Pillars, Dangerous Darkies, City Pillars, Bidvest Wits, Supersport United, Maritzburg United
Nakhon Ratchasima

Noah Chivuta joined Nakhon Ratchasima or Korat as the club is affectionately referred to in 2013 when they were in the Yamaha League 1 and helped them secure promotion to the Thai Premier League in the 2014 season.

Chivuta became the first Zambian player to win the Yamaha League 1 after helping Korat secure promotion in 2014, and has been putting up impressive performances in the Thai Premier League helping the club maintain their status in the 2015 season.

International career
He scored on debut for Zambia in a COSAFA Cup match against Mozambique in September 2007.

Chivuta has made thirty five appearances for the Zambia National Team and was part of the team that won the Africa Cup of Nations in 2012.

Honours

National Team
Zambia
Africa Cup of Nations: 2012 Champion

References

External links
 

1983 births
Living people
People from Ndola
Zambian footballers
Zambian expatriate footballers
Zambian expatriate sportspeople in South Africa
Expatriate footballers in Thailand
Expatriate soccer players in South Africa
Association football midfielders
Dangerous Darkies players
Bidvest Wits F.C. players
SuperSport United F.C. players
Zambia international footballers
2010 Africa Cup of Nations players
2012 Africa Cup of Nations players
2013 Africa Cup of Nations players
Maritzburg United F.C. players
Hellenic F.C. players
Free State Stars F.C. players
Kabwe Warriors F.C. players
Noah Chivuta
Noah Chivuta
Africa Cup of Nations-winning players
Zambian expatriate sportspeople in Thailand